Jacob Ng (born 20 November 1994) is an Australian professional boxer who has held the WBO Oriental and IBF International lightweight titles since 2019.

Early years
Ng was born on 20 November 1994 on the Gold Coast in Queensland. His father, Stephen, was a successful amateur boxer who also held the Queensland State middleweight title as a pro. He spent much of his childhood at his father's gym, Matrix Boxing Gym, initially taking up Brazilian jiu-jitsu at the age of ten. He competed in the sport nationally and internationally until the age of 18, becoming a blue belt with four tips.

He began boxing at the age of 15 and won a state amateur title before he started getting into trouble and partying. His dad sent him to Thailand for a year to compete in Muay Thai, where he compiled a professional record of 8–0–1 (8 KO).

Professional career
He made his professional boxing debut on 24 June 2017, defeating Sam Williams via a fourth-round technical knockout (TKO) in Eatons Hill, Queensland. He went on a winning streak, continuously picking up victories every two or three months and closing out 2018 by winning the Queensland State and Australian lightweight titles with back-to-back TKO's of Mark Ramirez and Gaige Ireland, respectively. On 16 March 2019 he stopped Filipino prospect Glenn Enterino (14–4–1, 9 KO) in the sixth round for the vacant IBF Youth lightweight title. Three months later, he won his fourth title in four fights when he defeated Mexican rival Ricardo Lara (19–5, 9 KO) by unanimous decision (UD) for the vacant IBF International lightweight title. This moved him into the top 15 of the IBF rankings. He successfully defended the belt in September, dropping Spanish contender Pablo Fuego (15–4, 2 KO) three times en route to a fifth-round TKO finish.

On 8 November 2019 he faced Kaewfah Tor Buamas for the vacant WBO Oriental lightweight title. He won the belt with a third-round TKO victory. Now ranked #11 in both the IBF and WBO rankings, Ng was scheduled to defend both his IBF International and WBO Oriental titles against Japanese veteran Valentine Hosokawa (25–7–3, 12 KO) in March 2020. However, the undefeated Australian pulled out due to injury and the bout was further postponed due to the COVID-19 pandemic.

Professional boxing record

References

External links
 

Living people
1994 births
Australian male boxers
Australian Muay Thai practitioners
Lightweight boxers
Sportspeople from the Gold Coast, Queensland